The Mosconi Cup is an annual nine-ball pool tournament contested since 1994 between teams representing Europe and the United States. Named after American pool player Willie Mosconi, the event is comparable to the Ryder Cup in golf and the Weber Cup in bowling.

Team composition and formats have varied over the years. Currently, each team has five playing members. Each team also has a captain and vice captain, who may be among the players, or may be non-playing additional members of the team. The teams compete over one team match, several doubles matches and singles matches, with the first team to win 11 matches claiming victory.

Latest edition: Team Europe has beaten Team USA 11–7 on 3 December 2022, kept the title and taking an overall series lead at 15–13, with one tie.

History and player selection
First staged in 1994 by Sky Sports and Matchroom Sport as an exhibition event to increase public awareness of pool in the United Kingdom, the Mosconi Cup was named to commemorate the legacy of American pool player Willie Mosconi, who died in 1993.

In the first year of competition, each team featured six men and two women, with Germany's Franziska Stark and England's Allison Fisher on Team Europe, and Jeanette Lee and Vivian Villarreal on Team USA. No women appeared after the initial event, although Kelly Fisher in 2021 called on organizers to reinstate female players. In the event's early years, professional snooker players Ronnie O'Sullivan, Jimmy White, Alex Higgins, and Steve Davis all competed on Team Europe.

Staged in England for its first nine years, the Mosconi Cup from 2003 to 2020 alternated annually between the US and Europe, with all US-based tournaments taking place in Las Vegas, Nevada and most European tournaments taking place in England. The Mosconi Cups of 2004 and 2006 were held in the Netherlands and the 2008 event was held in Malta. In 2020 and 2021, two consecutive Mosconi Cups were held in England.

As time progressed, the event evolved from its exhibition nature into a much more serious and professional tournament. Among the snooker players, only Davis continued into the event's more serious era, competing in the first eleven Mosconi Cups and bowing out only when the event began to clash with snooker's UK Championship, at which he appeared as both a player and a BBC commentator. After Davis's withdrawal, all players had to earn an invitation through their performances at other pool events, meaning that no more snooker players appeared until 2007 when Tony Drago earned a place by virtue of his performance on the European Pool Tour.

Both teams have dominated the tournament for extended periods. Team USA won ten of the first twelve tournaments between 1994 and 2005, including six consecutive victories. The 2006 tournament was a tie, and Team Europe then won ten times in eleven years between 2007 and 2017, including eight consecutive victories. The overall series record now stands at 15–13 to Team Europe.

Joshua Filler of Germany became the youngest player to participate in the Mosconi Cup at 20 years old, in 2017. Earl Strickland of the United States became the oldest player to participate in the Mosconi Cup at 61 years old, in 2022.

The record for the most Mosconi Cup appearances is 17, held jointly by Germany's Ralf Souquet and the USA's Johnny Archer. The record for the most Mosconi Cup wins is 9, held jointly by USA's Johnny Archer and the USA's Earl Strickland.

Player appearances
The players to have appeared in the Mosconi Cup:

European players

American players

 1 Born outside the United States

Player wins
The players to have been on a winning team in the Mosconi Cup:

European players

American players

 1 Born outside the United States

Player representation

European nations
Players from sixteen nations have represented Europe. Sorted by number of different people, (number of appearances), and alphabetically, these are:

American states
Players from twenty-two states have represented the United States (Charlie Williams and Johan Ruijsink were both born outside of the US). Ordered as above, these are:

Tournament modifications
There have been rule changes and format changes throughout the tournament's history. These include, but are not limited to: "Non-playing captain" roles were introduced in the 2003 event; however these were removed in the 2004 tournament. In 2004 the doubles matches were re-formatted to be . In 2005, a 30-second shot clock was introduced, and caused controversy due to timing malfunctions. The 2006 tournament started with a team-versus-team match followed by two trebles matches. That year also saw the reintroduction of the non-playing captain role.

The 2009 tournament included several new features:
 No pairing in the doubles matches could be repeated.
 The event included four blocks of consecutive matches, organized so that five slots were available for each side, in which every player was required to play exactly once.
 In two singles matches, each player was selected by the opposing team captain.

Results by year

See also

References

External links

 
Pool competitions
Recurring sporting events established in 1994
1994 establishments in England
Annual sporting events
December sporting events